Edward Briggs may refer to:

 Edward Briggs (politician) (1854–1941), farmer and political figure in Manitoba
 Edward S. Briggs (1926–2022), vice admiral in the U.S. Navy

See also
 Ted Briggs (Albert Edward Pryke Briggs, 1923–2008), British seaman and last survivor of the destruction of the battlecruiser HMS Hood